José Manuel Alcañiz Andreu (born 12 July 1990) is a Spanish footballer who plays as a central defender for Spanish club Quintanar del Rey.

Club career
Born in Madrid, Alcañiz graduated from local Rayo Vallecano's youth system, making his senior debuts with the reserves in the 2008–09 season, in the Tercera División. On 16 April 2011, he played his first game as a professional, starting in a 1–0 away win against SD Ponferradina in the Segunda División. On 29 May, in his first start, he was sent off in a 4–2 success at FC Cartagena also in the league.

On 9 August 2013, free agent Alcañiz signed with neighbouring CF Fuenlabrada of the Segunda División B. On 12 July of the following year, he moved to SD Compostela also in the third level.

On 11 July 2015, Alcañiz joined CE Sabadell FC, recently relegated to the third tier.

References

External links

1990 births
Living people
Spanish footballers
Footballers from Madrid
Association football defenders
Rayo Vallecano B players
Rayo Vallecano players
CF Fuenlabrada footballers
SD Compostela footballers
CE Sabadell FC footballers
CD Guadalajara (Spain) footballers
Zamora CF footballers
Segunda División players
Segunda División B players
Tercera División players